S.M. Khan, is a senior Indian Information Service officer of Government of India . Prior to his current assignment he served as the Director General of Doordarshan News for over 3 years.

Khan, a 1982-batch IIS officer, had a long innings with CBI as its spokesperson and Press Secretary to then President of India A P J Abdul Kalam.Mr. SM Khan is on Facebook, Twitter and his Twitter account is @smkhandg. 
Mr Khan has recently been appointed as Director of Jamia Hamdard Residential Coaching Academy and will provide guidance to the aspirants preparing for civil service.

Early life and education
Khan hails from town Khurja in Uttar Pradesh. He belongs to a family of lawyers. He studied law for his graduation and pursued LLM from Aligarh University. He was awarded the Chancellors Gold Medal for topping the entire University. He later went to University of Wales for a degree in Economics.

Important postings
During his nearly 13 years service in Central Bureau of Investigation, India's Premier Investigation Agency, Khan was the face of the agency appearing regularly on national and international media, which at that time had been handling several high-profile cases, including Harshad Mehta finance scam, Rajiv Gandhi assassination, Bofors besides others.

Khan served as Press Secretary to the Hon’ble President of India (2002 to 2007) Dr. APJ Abdul Kalam. He dealt with National and International media during his stint in President House and acted as Chief Spokesman for the President of India and President House. Accompanied the President on official tours to different countries and within India.

Khan had also served government of India's Directorate of Film Festival(DFF) as Director for two years and was heading the coveted India International Film Festival. As Director, DFF he was also responsible for the National Film Awards and Dada Saheb Phalke Awards. He also represented India at the Cannes and Berlin Film Festival.

Khan has also served at the Press Information Bureau as a Director General and he currently is serving as the Press Registrar of India. He along with the then Minister of Information&Broadcasting Shri Prakash Javadekar released " Press In India ".

Mr. SM Khan on 12 January 2014 was elected as the Trustee, India Islamic Cultural Center established to promote mutual understanding and amity amongst the people of the country.
Mr S.M. Khan on 07.01.2019 has been elected as the Vice President, India Islamic Cultural Centre. He won the much hyped election very comfortably.

Mr S.M.Khan is a member of the Aligarh Muslim University (court) and was also appointed recently appointed by the President of India as his nominee in the executive council of Aligarh Muslim University

Mr. Khan started the webcasting of news bulletins of Doordarshan News from the regional news centers.

Author
SM Khan has written his debut book on the "People's President Dr. APJ Abdul Kalam". The book shares his experiences with Dr. Kalam during and post presidency. It provides insight into various facets of Dr. Kalam's life including important highlights of his travel in India and abroad. The book has been published by Bloomsbury Publishing and was release in January 2017 by the Hon'ble Vice President of India Shri Hamid Ansari and Hon'ble Finance Minister of India Shri Arun Jaitley. The first copy of the book was presented to the Hon'ble Prime Minister of India Shri Narendra Modi.

References

1957 births
Living people
Aligarh Muslim University alumni
Indian civil servants
Alumni of the University of Wales